Maqbool is a 2004 Indian crime drama film directed by Vishal Bhardwaj and starring Irrfan, Tabu, Pankaj Kapur, Naseeruddin Shah, Om Puri, Piyush Mishra, Murali Sharma and Masumeh Makhija in an adaptation of the play Macbeth by Shakespeare.

The plot of the film is based on that of Macbeth with regard to events and characterisation. The film did not perform remarkably at the box office, but won director Vishal Bhardwaj international acclaim. Apart from directing it, he had also composed the background score and songs for the film. Bhardwaj then moved on to adapting William Shakespeare's Othello in his 2006 film Omkara which won him commercial as well as critical success. He then directed Haider in 2014 adapting Hamlet, leading to what is now called his Shakespeare trilogy.

The film had its North American premiere at the 2003 Toronto International Film Festival. Though the film failed to garner much of an audience during its theatrical run in India, critics were appreciative and Pankaj Kapur went on to win a Filmfare Award for Best Actor (Critics) and a National Film Award for Best Supporting Actor. The film was screened in the Marché du Film section of the 2004 Cannes Film Festival.

Plot
The film is based on William Shakespeare's Macbeth, with the Mumbai underworld as its backdrop. Miyan Maqbool (Irrfan Khan) is the right-hand man of Jahangir Khan (alias Abba Ji) (Pankaj Kapur), a powerful underworld don. Maqbool is grateful and feels a close connection and personal indebtedness to Abba Ji. Seeing their close relationship, but also sensing Maqbool's ambition, two corrupt policemen (Om Puri and Naseeruddin Shah) predict that Maqbool will soon take over the reins of the Mumbai Underworld from Abba Ji. 
 
Nimmi (Tabu) is Abba Ji's mistress, but she and Maqbool are secretly in love. Nimmi encourages Maqbool's ambitions and persuades him to kill Abba Ji to take over as Don. Maqbool is torn between his love for Nimmi and his loyalty to Abba Ji, but he begins to prepare the ground for becoming a Don, by ensuring that others in the line of succession cannot interfere. Finally, Maqbool murders Abba Ji in cold blood while he is in bed at night, with Nimmi next to him.  Maqbool gets away with the murder and takes over as Don, just as planned; but both he and Nimmi are haunted by guilt, seeing Abba Ji's ghost and unable to wash the blood from their hands. There is also suspicion, within the gang, of Maqbool's role in the death of Abba Ji, and eventually the lovers meet a tragic end.

In addition to the portrayals of the three tragic heroes, the film offers performances by supporting cast members, in particular Om Puri and Naseeruddin Shah. The two open the film in their roles as black comic relief corrupt police inspectors-cum-astrologers, predict the fall of Abba Ji—who has them on his payroll—and the rise and fall of Maqbool. Contrary to the original play, the corrupt cops are not just passive soothsayers. In an effort to sustain what they refer to as "balancing forces," they are also actively involved in shaping events, like aiding in providing information to Abba Ji's enforcers to wipe out a rival gang, using subtle nuances in coercing Maqbool to shift loyalties, deliberately botching an "encounter" attempt on Riyaz Boti (Macduff) and subsequently setting up an alliance between a rival politician (the incumbent one was backed by Abba Ji) and a fleeing Guddu (Fleance) and Riyaz Boti against Maqbool.

Cast

Production 
Irrfan Khan was selected to portray the lead role after attempts to sign Kamal Haasan, Akshay Kumar and Kay Kay Menon failed.

Reception
Maqbool received universal critical acclaim. Rediff described the film as "a visual gallery that is an intelligent blend of dark, tragic overtones and comic, satirical undertones". Variety wrote that while the visuals are great, audiences might need an understanding of Macbeth to fully enjoy the film. India Today described it as a "haunting operatic tragedy". Outlook said that it "effectively transported the essence of the story to the milieu of the Bombay underworld of our times".

Soundtrack

The soundtrack features eleven songs composed by Vishal Bhardwaj with lyrics by Gulzar.

Further reading 
Mendes, AC. “Transculturating Shakespeare: Vishal Bhardwaj’s Mumbai Macbeth”, Casie Hermansson and Janet Zepernick (eds.), Where is Adaptation? Mapping cultures, texts, and contexts. Amsterdam: John Benjamins, 165–180.

References

External links
 
 
 Review at Rediff.com
 Review at Variety.com
 The Hollywood Reporter review

2003 films
2004 crime drama films
2000s Hindi-language films
2000s Urdu-language films
Indian crime drama films
Films based on Macbeth
Modern adaptations of works by William Shakespeare
Films about organised crime in India
Films directed by Vishal Bhardwaj
Films set in Mumbai
Films featuring a Best Supporting Actor National Film Award-winning performance
Films scored by Vishal Bhardwaj
Indian films based on plays
Films distributed by Yash Raj Films
Urdu-language Indian films